Sovetsky is a town and the administrative center of Sovetsky District in Khanty-Mansi Autonomous Okrug, Russia, located  west of Khanty-Mansiysk, the administrative center of the autonomous okrug. Population:

History
It was founded in 1963 and granted urban-type settlement status in 1963. Town status was granted to it in 1997.

Administrative and municipal status
Within the framework of administrative divisions, Sovetsky serves as the administrative center of Sovetsky District, to which it is directly subordinated. As a municipal division, the town of Sovetsky is incorporated within Sovetsky Municipal District as Sovetsky Urban Settlement.

Transportation
The town is served by the Sovetsky Airport.

References

Notes

Sources

Cities and towns in Khanty-Mansi Autonomous Okrug